JKB may refer to:

Jesse Knight Building
Jordan Kuwait Bank
Jüdischer Kulturbund
 J. K. Bracken's GAC